Georgann Johnson (born Georgia Anne Johnson, August 15, 1926 – June 4, 2018) was an American stage, film, and television actress. She was also known as Georgiann Johnson and Georgianne Johnson.

Early years 
Johnson was born in Decorah, Iowa, the daughter of George and Helene (Hjerleid) Johnson. She attended Decorah High School, Luther College, and Northwestern University before becoming an actress in 1952.

Stage 
In 1953, Johnson was cast with her future husband, actor Stanley Prager, in the Broadway revival of Room Service starring Jack Lemmon. Johnson and Prager wed in 1956. Her other Broadway credits include Critic's Choice (1960), Drink to Me Only (1958), and Reclining Figure (1954).

Prager gave up his career as an actor after he testified in 1955 as a witness before the House Un-American Activities Committee. Johnson later appeared in two films directed by Martin Ritt, who had been caught in the Hollywood blacklist as well: The Front (1976) and Murphy’s Romance (1985).

Film 
In films, Johnson had roles in Short Cut to Hell (1957), Midnight Cowboy (1969), From the Mixed-Up Files of Mrs. Basil E. Frankweiler (1973), Health (1980), The Day After (1983), The Slugger's Wife (1985), Murphy's Romance (1985) and Quicksilver (1986).

Television 

Johnson debuted on television in commercials. In 1965, she played Lois Carter in an episode of The Fugitive, and in 1967, she played Laura Craig in the same series. She played the blind love interest to Charles Bronson, who used his unexpected fortune to pay for surgery to restore her sight, in an episode of The Millionaire She went on to play Alice Snowden in Archie Bunker's Place, Dorothy Jarvis in Cutter to Houston, Marge Weskitt on Mister Peepers, and Katherine McKay on Our Family Honor. She was also a regular on The Larry Storch Show. 

During the 1970s, she appeared in the long-running crossover role of Ellen Grant in Another World and its spinoff Somerset, as well as Jane Spencer in As the World Turns. She later played Charlotte O'Neill, mother of the title character in The Trials of Rosie O'Neill. She played Doreen Selvy in Alfred Hitchcock Presents' "The Night of the Execution". In November 1993, Johnson took over the role of Mrs. Elizabeth Quinn on the CBS Series, Dr. Quinn, Medicine Woman during its second season. She continued in the role for the remainder of the series and several made-for-TV movies.

Personal life 
Johnson married Prager in 1954, and they remained together until his death in 1972. In 1981, she married Jack Tenner. They remained wed until his death in 2008.

Death 
On June 4, 2018, Johnson died in Los Angeles at the age of 91.

Partial filmography

Short Cut to Hell (1957) - Glory Hamilton
The Fugitive (1965) - Season 3, Episode 15 - Lois Carter 
Midnight Cowboy (1969) - Rich Lady - New York
From the Mixed-Up Files of Mrs. Basil E. Frankweiler (1973) - Mrs. Kincaid
The Front (1976) - T.V. Interviewer
Hart to Hart (1979) - Mrs. Capello
Health (1980) - Lily Bell
Looker (1981) - Cindy's Mother
Shoot the Moon (1982) - Isabel
Three's Company (1982) -Jack Tripper's Mother
Mama's Family (1983) - Bunny Van Courtland
The Day After (1983, TV Movie) - Helen Oakes
Highland Fling (1983) Hart to Hart
Too Close for Comfort (1985) - Monroe's Girlfriend
The Slugger's Wife (1985) - Marie DeVito
Murphy's Romance (1985) - Margaret
Quicksilver (1986) - Mrs. Casey
Blind Date (1987) - Mrs. Gruen
Father Hood (1993) - Judge
Dr Quinn, Medicine Woman (1993-1998) - Elizabeth Ann Weston Quinn
Seven Girlfriends (1999) - Anabeth's Mother
Dr Quinn, Medicine Woman: The Heart Within  (2001) - Elizabeth Ann Weston Quinn
The Deep End (2001) - 50ish Woman (uncredited)

References

External links

1926 births
2018 deaths
Actresses from Iowa
American film actresses
American stage actresses
American television actresses
Luther College (Iowa) alumni
Northwestern University alumni
People from Decorah, Iowa
Hollywood blacklist
20th-century American women
21st-century American women